Masaji Ogino (荻野 正二 Ogino Masaji, born January 8, 1970, in Onyū District, Fukui) is a volleyball player from Japan, who played for the Men's National Team in the 1990s and the 2000s. He ended up in sixteenth place at the 1998 World Championship.

Honours

1992 Olympic Games — 6th place
1998 World Championship — 16th place
2006 World Championship — 8th place
2007 FIVB World Cup — 9th place

References
 Profile

1970 births
Living people
Japanese men's volleyball players
Volleyball players at the 1992 Summer Olympics
Olympic volleyball players of Japan
Volleyball players at the 2008 Summer Olympics
Asian Games medalists in volleyball
Volleyball players at the 1990 Asian Games
Volleyball players at the 2006 Asian Games
Medalists at the 1990 Asian Games
Asian Games bronze medalists for Japan
20th-century Japanese people
21st-century Japanese people